Bogatyrovka is a village in the Jeti-Ögüz District of Issyk-Kul Region of Kyrgyzstan. Its population was 1,276 in 2021.

References

Populated places in Issyk-Kul Region